Pavlovci is a village located in the municipality of Ruma, Vojvodina, Serbia. As of 2011 census, it has a population of 393 inhabitants.

Name
The name of the town in Serbian is plural.

See also
 List of places in Serbia
 List of cities, towns and villages in Vojvodina

References

Populated places in Syrmia